The 1958–59 Cincinnati Royal season was the 14th season of the franchise, its 11th season in the NBA and second season in Cincinnati.

This season is being one of the most notorious seasons faced by an NBA team in the league's history. The reason was the tragic career-ending head injury to star Maurice Stokes, who became permanently hospitalized at the age of 24 at the end of the previous season, which had been the team's first in Cincinnati. The loss of Stokes shocked six other roster players into retirement. Also, the team had been sold to new, inexperienced local ownership and also soon had to replace their coach.
Star shooter Jack Twyman returned for the club as the only returnee from a year ago. Had Twyman accepted other offers that year, the team would have likely folded.

St. Louis owner Ben Kerner, a long-time friend of previous owners Les and Jack Harrison, agreed to help the club. He sent five players to the Royals in return for All-Pro Clyde Lovellette and the rights to talented Si Green. The result was a diluted roster of rookies and journeymen.
Two rookies were burly 6-foot 8-inch big man Wayne Embry and 6' 4 defender Arlen Bockhorn. Both had to make the team before being offered contracts, and both were pleasant surprises to the beleaguered team.
Twyman was far and away the team's only star. He scored 25.8 points per game, trying more shots than any player in the league for his new team. The slender 6-foot 6-inch star also led the Royals in rebounds, and came within 16 assists of leading the team there as well. More than that, he mentored the new players and also carried on Stokes's charity causes off the court. He achieved a kind of fame, respect and notoriety unlike any NBA player ever. One of his creations to pay for his fallen teammate's soaring hospital bills was The Maurice Stokes Charity Game, which was played at Kutcher's resort in Monticello, New York, every August. A slew of NBA notables came to play in the event for Stokes every year.

Despite Twyman's starring play, the Royals sank to 19–53 this season after contending much of the previous season. To limit over-exposure of a bad product at home, some 17 home games were played elsewhere this season. Several times that year, the team failed to draw 2000 fans to Cincinnati Gardens.

Somehow, the new ownership made it through the season and vowed to carry on. The NBA was of some help, granting territorial draft picks to Oscar Robertson and Ralph Davis from the local University of Cincinnati, as well as local high school player Jerry Lucas.

Regular season

Season standings

x – clinched playoff spot

Record vs. opponents

Game log

Player statistics

References

Sacramento Kings seasons
Cincinnati
Cincinnati
Cincinnati